Trimax Investments GmbH is an Austrian company, registered in 2006 as a limited liability company. It works in the field of holding companies (excluding investment companies). It is based in Hallein, Salzburg.

The company holds a 24.99% share (out of 62.24% shared with two other foreign companies, all non-transparent) in Novosti a.d., a Serbian media company.  The company attorney toward Novosti a.d. is Aleksandar Hadžić. The three companies' non-transparency has been used as an example of problem in ownership structure in Serbian companies.

References

Investment management companies of Austria
Financial services companies established in 2006
Companies based in Salzburg
Austria–Serbia relations